Valea-Trestieni is a commune in Nisporeni District, Moldova. It is composed of five villages: Isăicani, Luminița, Odobești, Selișteni and Valea-Trestieni.

References

Communes of Nisporeni District